Elections to the French National Assembly were held in French Somaliland on 18 November 1962 as part of the wider French parliamentary elections. Ahmed-Idriss Moussa was elected as the territory's MP, defeating incumbent Hassan Gouled Aptidon.

Results

References

French Somaliland
1962 in French Somaliland
Elections in Djibouti
November 1962 events in Africa